Hysterionica is a genus of flowering plants in the family Asteraceae.

 Species
 Hysterionica aberrans (Cabrera) Cabrera - Tucumán 
 Hysterionica bakeri Hicken - Catamarca, Jujuy, Córdoba, Salta, Tucumán, Santiago del Estero, Chaco, Bolivia
 Hysterionica cabrerae Ariza - La Rioja, San Juan, Mendoza
 Hysterionica dianthifolia (Griseb.) Cabrera - 	Córdoba
 Hysterionica filiformis (Spreng.) Cabrera - Rio Grande do Sul, Uruguay, Entre Ríos
 Hysterionica glaucifolia (Kuntze) Solbrig - Mendoza
 Hysterionica gracilis (Don ex Sweet) Benth. & Hook.f. - Uruguay
 Hysterionica jasionoides Willd. - Argentina (from Jujuy to Santa Cruz)
 Hysterionica montevidensis Baker - Paraguay, Uruguay, Rio Grande do Sul, Corrientes, Entre Ríos, Misiones
 Hysterionica pinifolia (Poir.) Baker - Uruguay, Rio Grande do Sul, Buenos Aires
 Hysterionica pinnatiloba Matzenb. & Sobral - Rio Grande do Sul 
 Hysterionica pinnatisecta Matzenb. & Sobral - Rio Grande do Sul, Santa Catarina
 Hysterionica pulchella Cabrera - Catamarca, La Rioja, Salta, Tucumán

References

Asteraceae genera
Astereae